Qariyeh Sharaf (also Romanized as Qarīyeh Sharaf) is a village in Dowlatkhaneh Rural District, Bajgiran District, Quchan County, Razavi Khorasan Province, Iran. At the 2006 census, its population was 320, in 82 families.

References 

Populated places in Quchan County